Aiken House is a historic home located in Rensselaer in Rensselaer County, New York.  It was built about 1816 and is a -story, rectangular, brick townhouse dated to the Federal period.  It has a -story rear wing.  It features stepped gable sides.  It was built by the founder of the City of Rensselaer, William Akin, and designed by noted Albany architect Philip Hooker (1766-1836).

It was listed on the National Register of Historic Places in 1974.

References

Houses on the National Register of Historic Places in New York (state)
Federal architecture in New York (state)
Houses completed in 1816
Houses in Rensselaer County, New York
1816 establishments in New York (state)
National Register of Historic Places in Rensselaer, New York
National Register of Historic Places in Rensselaer County, New York